Radek Ťoupal (born August 16, 1966 in Písek, Czechoslovakia) is a former ice hockey player. His debut in Czechoslovak ice hockey league came in season 1982/1983, playing for HC České Budějovice, when he was only 16. During an army duty spent two years playing for Slovakian club HC Dukla Trenčín. He played on 1992 Bronze Medal winning Olympic ice hockey team for Czechoslovakia and also on Bronze Medal winning 1993 World Championships. Drafted 6th round draft choice of the Edmonton Oilers in 1987. Radek earned a university degree and is qualified to be a teacher. He left professional ice hockey in 2001.

Career statistics

Regular season and playoffs

International

External links

1966 births
Living people
Sportspeople from Písek
Czech ice hockey centres
Czechoslovak ice hockey centres
EC Kapfenberg players
Edmonton Oilers draft picks
Motor České Budějovice players
HK Dukla Trenčín players
HPK players
Ice hockey players at the 1992 Winter Olympics
Ice hockey players at the 1994 Winter Olympics
Olympic bronze medalists for Czechoslovakia
Olympic ice hockey players of Czechoslovakia
Olympic ice hockey players of the Czech Republic
Starbulls Rosenheim players
Olympic medalists in ice hockey
Medalists at the 1992 Winter Olympics
Czechoslovak expatriate sportspeople in Finland
Czechoslovak expatriate ice hockey people
Czech expatriate ice hockey players in Finland
Czech expatriate sportspeople in Austria
Czech expatriate ice hockey players in Germany
Expatriate ice hockey players in Austria